Belana thereof may refer to:

a synonym for Vilana, a white Greek wine grape variety
*Běľana, believed to be the original name of Biljana, a settlement in Slovenia
Belana Creek, Slovenia - see Pristava, Cirkulane
Belana, a steamboat that operated in western Washington state - see List of Puget Sound steamboats
Belana, a character in Sectaurs comic books or books

See also
B'Elanna Torres, a main character in the TV series Star Trek: Voyager